The 1927 North Dakota Flickertails football team, also known as the Nodaks, was an American football team that represented the University of North Dakota in the North Central Conference (NCC) during the 1927 college football season. In its second year under head coach Tod Rockwell, the team compiled a 4–4 record (1–2 against NCC opponents), finished in a tie for seventh place out of nine teams in the NCC, and was outscored by a total of 103 to 88.

Schedule

References

North Dakota
North Dakota Fighting Hawks football seasons
North Dakota Flickertails football